Coalmont may refer to one of the following places:

United States
Coalmont, Colorado
Coalmont, Indiana
Coalmont, Pennsylvania
Coalmont, Tennessee

Canada
Coalmont, British Columbia